Duck! Rabbit, Duck! is a 1953 Warner Bros. Merrie Melodies cartoon directed by Charles M. Jones. The cartoon was released on October 3, 1953 and stars Bugs Bunny, Daffy Duck and Elmer Fudd.

The cartoon is the third of Jones' "hunting trilogy", which began with 1951's Rabbit Fire and 1952's Rabbit Seasoning.

Plot
Set in winter, we find Daffy Duck removing and burning every "Duck Season Open" sign he finds in order to warm himself in the winter, and prevent himself from being hunted. Elmer is out hunting and Daffy uses several signs to convince Elmer that it is rabbit season, making Elmer excited about "Fwesh wabbit stew!" just before Elmer follows a yellow line to Bugs' rabbit hole. Daffy lures Bugs Bunny out by asking for a cup of blackstrap molasses. Just as Bugs Bunny comes out of his rabbit hole, Elmer points the gun at him and declares that he got his "wabbit stew". However, Bugs is already prepared for Daffy's trick and attempts to convince Elmer not to shoot him because he is obviously an endangered species — a fricasseeing rabbit — and that Elmer does not have a license to shoot fricasseeing rabbits.

 This enrages Daffy, who attempts to convince Elmer Fudd that Bugs Bunny is actually trying to fool Elmer and orders Elmer to shoot Bugs, prompting Elmer to regretfully point out that he does not have the proper license. Exasperated, Daffy writes out the proper hunting license but has to ask Bugs how to spell "fricasseeing". Bugs tells him, "F-R-I-C-A-S-S-E-E-I-N-G", adding "D-U-C-K". Oblivious to the trick, Daffy gives Elmer the "license" and Elmer obediently blasts Daffy. This leads into an extended routine in this short which has Bugs holding up various season signs to correspond with every figurative expression involving an animal which Daffy is called, either by himself or by Bugs in response (including "goat", "dirty skunk", "pigeon" and "mongoose"). Each presentation of the sign is accompanied by a brass fanfare of a fox hunting call, and is, of course, followed by a gunshot, after each shot, the irritated Daffy is forced to put his beak back in place.

At one point, Bugs builds a snow rabbit image of himself and when Elmer blasts it, Bugs Bunny appears disguised as an angel which Elmer believes, to Daffy's total disgust.

Bugs then puts on a duck disguise. Daffy (who has now instructed Elmer to "pay no more attention to no more signs, you're just gonna listen to me") sees him and says "Shoot the duck! Shoot the duck!" to which Elmer obliges by shooting the nearest duck — Daffy. Daffy finally goes completely insane, demanding "Shoot me again! I enjoy it! I love the smell of burnt feathers and gunpowder and cordite!" then holding up his fingers at the top of his head like the antlers of an elk and scuttling around sideways like a crab, shrieking that it is elk and fiddler crab season, respectively, and that Elmer should shoot him. The antics become truly confusing at the end when the now-totally bewildered Elmer encounters a game warden (actually Bugs in disguise) and begs him to tell Elmer what hunting season it really is, to which the "game warden" tells Elmer that it is baseball season while holding up a baseball.

Upon hearing this, Elmer loses his sanity and starts shooting at the baseball (which Bugs throws out a little bit in front of him) as he goes off into the distance. When he is gone, Bugs removes his disguise and asks Daffy what hunting season it really is. Daffy casually answers not to be naive, everybody knows that it is really duck season and ends up getting blasted by several hunters hiding behind rocks all at the same time. Devastated, Daffy reattaches his bill and weakly drags himself to Bugs who is eating a carrot, climbs up his uniform and remarks "You're despicable!" and Bugs gives one last look to the audience as the cartoon irises out.

Cast
 Mel Blanc as Bugs Bunny and Daffy Duck
 Arthur Q. Bryan as Elmer Fudd

Reception
In a commentary by Eric Goldberg, he cites the short as his favorite in the hunting trilogy. Goldberg praises the setting, describing it as "Maurice Noble's beautiful snowscape", reasoning "it makes the action read that much cleaner". When discussing the whole hunting trilogy, Forrest Wickman at Slate states "The formula is simple, but what makes the cartoons classics are the small variations in execution." Wickman praises the various ways Daffy is shot.

Animation historian David Gerstein writes, "Duck! Rabbit, Duck! succeeds because the exaggeration of the villain role blends perfectly with the cartoon's exaggeration of Bugs, its exaggeration of Elmer — and its exaggeration of logic. Duck! Rabbit, Duck! is a cartoon that derives its entire mood from pushing gags past conventional Looney Tunes limits."

In popular culture
A small clip from this cartoon (specifically the scene where Daffy says at Elmer, "I'm an elk! Shoot me!") is briefly seen in the film Space Jam, right after the camera moves away from the clip from Muzzle Tough.

Home media
VHS: Warner Bros. Cartoons Golden Jubilee 24-Karat Collection: Bugs Bunny's Wacky Adventures, Lethal Weapon 3 (U.K. release only)
Laserdisc: Daffy Duck's Screen Classics: Duck Victory
DVD: Looney Tunes Golden Collection: Volume 3
DVD/Blu-ray: Looney Tunes Platinum Collection: Volume 2

References

External links

 
 

1953 films
1953 short films
1953 comedy films
1953 animated films
1950s Warner Bros. animated short films
Merrie Melodies short films
Films about hunters
Bugs Bunny films
Daffy Duck films
Elmer Fudd films
Fictional rivalries
Films set in forests
Short films directed by Chuck Jones
Films scored by Carl Stalling
Warner Bros. Cartoons animated short films
Films with screenplays by Michael Maltese
1950s English-language films